John Bracken was an American priest of the Episcopal Church who was the rector of Bruton Parish Church and the ninth president of the College of William and Mary, serving from 1812 to 1814. In 1792, Bracken helped to reestablish the Grammar School at the College of William and Mary.

References

External links
Finding aid for the John Bracken Papers
SCRC Wiki entry for John Bracken

18th-century American Episcopal priests
College of William & Mary faculty
Presidents of the College of William & Mary